Serguei Kouchnerov (Siarhiej Kušniaroŭ, born 22 June 1960 in Rahachow, Byelorussian SSR) is a Belarusian-Ukrainian artist, animator, director, story artist and screenwriter. He started his career as an animator and director in Kiev, Ukraine. In 1992, he was hired by Walt Disney Feature Animation as a character animator and came to the United States of America, where he currently lives and works at Illumination Entertainment.

Career
Serguei worked for Kyivnaukfilm in Kyiv, Ukraine  (then part of the Soviet Union) on the animated feature film Treasure Island (1988) and on many other animated short films. After moving to the United States he worked for Walt Disney Feature Animation on Fantasia 2000 before joining DreamWorks Animation for such animated feature films as The Prince of Egypt (1998), The Road to El Dorado (2000), Shrek 2 (2004),  Bee Movie (2007), Madagascar (2005), Over the Hedge (2006), and Madagascar 2 (2008). One of his current works as an author was a CGI animated short film The Hybrid Union.

Filmography
  As Director
  The Hybrid Union (CGI animated short film, 2010)
 The Log (Animated short film, 1988)
 A Vicious Circle, (Animated short film, 1988)
 The muddle-headed/Hopeless Wombat (Animated short film, 1991)

 As Supervising animator / Character animator
 Madagascar 2 (2008) (Character animator) - DreamWorks Animation
 Bee Movie (2007) (Character animator) - DreamWorks Animation
 Over the Hedge (2006) (Character animator) - DreamWorks Animation
 Madagascar (2005) (Character animator) - DreamWorks Animation
 Shrek 2 (2004) (Character animator) - DreamWorks Animation 
 Sinbad: Legend of the Seven Seas (2003) (Supervising animator) - DreamWorks Animation
 Spirit: Stallion of the Cimarron (2002) (Character animator) - DreamWorks Animation
 The Road to El Dorado (2000) (Supervising animator) - DreamWorks Animation
 The Prince of Egypt (1998) (Supervising animator) - DreamWorks Animation
 Fantasia 2000 (2000) (Character animator, Character design) - Walt Disney Animation
 The Lion King (1994) (Game/Animator) - Walt Disney Animation
 Treasure Island (1988) (Lead animator) - Kievnauchfilm Kiev, Ukraine  (then Soviet Union) (Russian) 
 As Storyboard Artist
 Sinbad: Legend of the Seven Seas (2003) - DreamWorks Animation
 Bob's Burgers - (Animated TV Series/FOX)
As Story Artist
 The Super Mario Bros. Movie (2023) - (Illumination Entertainment / Universal Pictures)
 Minions: The Rise of Gru (2022) - (Illumination Entertainment / Universal Pictures)
 The Secret Life of Pets 2 (2019) - (Illumination Entertainment / Universal Pictures)
 Chicken Run (2000) - DreamWorks Animation / Aardman

References

External links
 Official website
 
 

1960 births
Living people
People from Kyiv
People from Rahachow
American animators
American film directors
American male screenwriters
American storyboard artists
Ukrainian film directors
Ukrainian animators
Belarusian animators
Ukrainian animated film directors
Belarusian animated film directors
Belarusian film directors
Belarusian screenwriters
Soviet animators
Soviet film directors
Walt Disney Animation Studios people
DreamWorks Animation people
Illumination (company) people